A list of people related to the University of Nottingham or to its predecessor, University College, Nottingham.

Office holders

Chancellors
 John Boot, 2nd Baron Trent (1949 - 1954)
 William Cavendish-Bentinck, 7th Duke of Portland (1954 - 1971)
 Sir Francis Hill (1971 - 1978)
 Sir Gordon Hobday (1978 - 1993)
 Ronald Dearing, Baron Dearing (1993 - 2000)
 Fujia Yang (2000 - 2012)
 Sir Andrew Witty (2013–2017)
 Baroness Young of Hornsey (2020–present)

Vice-Chancellors
 Bertrand Hallward (1948 - 1965)
 Frederick Dainton, Baron Dainton (1965 - 1970)
 John Butterfield, Baron Butterfield (1971 - 1975)
 Basil Weedon (1976 - 1988)
 Sir Colin Campbell (1988 - 2008)
 Sir David Greenaway (2008 - September 2017)
 Shearer West (October 2017 – present)

Notable alumni

Academia
 Bob Boucher – Vice-Chancellor of the University of Sheffield
 Arthur Carty – National Science Advisor to the Prime Minister of Canada
 Sir Bernard Crossland – President of the Institute of Mechanical Engineers
 Paul Dibb - Australian defence intelligence official and Head of the ANU Strategic and Defence Studies Centre
 Louis Essen – physicist
 Charles Bungay Fawcett - geographer
 Pamela Gillies - Vice-Chancellor of Glasgow Caledonian University
 Sir Clive Granger – 2003 Nobel Laureate, Economics
 Gerald Hawkins – Professor of Astronomy, noted for his interest in Stonehenge
 Harriet Hawkins - Professor of Human Geography, noted in the field of geohumanities
 Nigel Healey - Vice-Chancellor of Fiji National University
 Sir Brian Heap – Master of St Edmund's College, Cambridge and former Vice-President of the Royal Society
 Reginald Hugh Hickling – lawyer, colonial civil servant, law academic and author
 John Pilkington Hudson –  the university's first Professor of Horticulture
 Jack Lewis, Baron Lewis of Newnham – chemist
 Scot McKnight – Professor of Religious Studies at North Park University, recognised for his scholarship on the New Testament, early Christianity, and the historical Jesus
 Victor Mundella — Physicist; Professor of Physics, Northern Polytechnic Institute; Principal of Sunderland Technical College
 Sir Keith O'Nions – geologist, Director-General UK Research Councils
 Brian Norton – solar energy technologist, President, Dublin Institute of Technology
 Austin Quigley – Dean, Columbia College
 Nigel Shadbolt -Principal of Jesus College, Oxford and Chairman of the Open Data Institute 
 Roger Tomlinson – "father of GIS"
 Carl Trueman – author, Presbyterian theologian, and Professor of Historical Theology and Church History, Westminster Theological Seminary.
 Graham Twelftree – Distinguished Professor of New Testament, Regent University School of Divinity, renowned for his contribution to the Third Quest for the Historical Jesus and his extensive work on miracles in the New Testament
 Matthew P. Walker – Professor of Neuroscience and Psychology at the University of California, Berkeley, and Founder and Director of the Center for Human Sleep Science

Arts and media 

 Sue Arrowsmith - artist
 Matthew Bannister – BBC broadcaster and administrator
 Olav Bjortomt – quiz setter for The Times and notable contestant
 Robert Brustein – Harvard English professor, founder of Yale University repertory theatre and the American Repertory theatre
 Don Broco - British rock group
 Liz Carr – comedian and disabled rights activist
 Michael Coren – author and broadcaster
 Ian Dickson – judge of Australian Idol
 Mike Dilger – nature presenter on The One Show
 Elliott Gotkine – BBC South America correspondent
 Haydn Gwynne – actress
 London Grammar - British pop group
 Chris Hawkins – radio personality
 Oliver James – psychologist and TV presenter
 Theo James – actor
 Colin Matthews – composer
 David Matthews – composer
 James Moir – former controller of BBC Radio 2
 Jeff Randall – Daily Telegraph editor-at-large and Sky television presenter
 Katie Rowley Jones – actress
 Frances Ryan – journalist and author
 Clive Tyldesley – lead football commentator for ITV
 Ruth Wilson – actress
 Helen Willetts – BBC weather presenter
 Tracie Young – pop singer
 Natalie Pinkham - Sky Sports F1 presenter

Business
 Jonathan Browning – Chairman, Vauxhall Motors
Hosein Khajeh-Hosseiny -  founder OpenX Innovations 
 Clive Hollick, Baron Hollick – former owner of United News
 Steve Holliday  – CEO, National Grid plc
 Tim Martin – Chairman of Wetherspoons
 Judith McHale – President and CEO, Discovery Communications
 Kike Oniwinde – founder of BYP Network
 Sir Robert Phillis – Chief Executive, Guardian Media Group
 William Henry Revis - a lace and hosiery manufacturer and major benefactor of Nottingham University College. 
 John Rishton – CEO, Royal Ahold and Rolls-Royce
 John Timpson – Chairman, Timpson
 Andrew Witty – CEO, GlaxoSmithKline

Government and politics

United Kingdom 
 Tim Aker MEP - UK Independence Party
 Andrew Bridgen MP – Conservative
 Jeremy Browne MP – Liberal Democrat, Minister of State at the Foreign Office
 Neil Carmichael MP – Conservative
 David Drew MP - Labour
 Michael Dugher MP, Labour, PPS
 Parmjit Dhanda - Former Labour MP
 Tom Ellis - Former Labour MP, before defecting to Social Democratic Party
 Charlie Elphicke MP – Conservative
 John Henry Hayes MP – Conservative, Minister of State for Transport
 Jimmy Hood MP – Labour
 Kelvin Hopkins MP – Labour
 Tony Lloyd MP – Labour, former Minister of State at the Foreign Office
 Stephen Mosley MP – Conservative
 Meg Munn MP – Labour, former Minister for Women and Equality
 John Pugh MP – Liberal Democrat 
 Merlyn Rees - Former Labour MP and Home secretary
 Angela Smith MP – Labour
 Antoinette Sandbach MP - Conservative
 Dari Taylor - Former Labour MP
 Paddy Tipping - former Labour MP
 Nadia Whittome - Labour MP

International politics
 Peter Ala Adjetey – Speaker of the Parliament of Ghana between 2001 and 2005
 Isaac Kobina Abban – 9th Chief Justice of the Supreme Court of Ghana
 Philip Edward Archer – 8th Chief Justice of the Supreme Court of Ghana
 Zainab Bangura – Sierra Leone Foreign Minister, human rights campaigner, former Presidential Candidate
 Lateefa Al Gaood – first female Member of the Council of Representatives of Bahrain
 Abdoulie Janneh - former United Nations Executive Secretary of the Economic Commission for Africa (ECA)
 Alpha Kanu - Sierra Leonean politician and the current Sierra Leone minister of Presidential and Public Affairs. 
 Leon Lillie - US member of the Minnesota House of Representatives.
 Judith McHale – US Under Secretary of State for Public Diplomacy and Public Affairs
 Tun Dato Seri Haji Hamdan Bin Sheik Tahir – former Governor of Penang, Malaysia
 Tunku Tan-Sri Imran ibni Tuanku Jaafar – former Malaysian ambassador and Sultan of Negeri Sembilan
 Tengku Ahmad Rithauddeen Ismail – former Malaysian Minister of Defense, former Malaysian Minister of Foreign Affairs. 
 Mikhail Svetov – Russian politician, one of the main ideologists and popularizers of libertarianism in Russia

Royalty 
 His Majesty Sultan Tuanku Ja'afar – tenth King of Malaysia, Yang Dipertuan Besar of Negeri Sembilan
 His Majesty Sultan Raja Azlan Shah – ninth King of Malaysia, current Sultan of Perak
 Zara Salim Davidson – wife of the Raja Muda (Crown Prince) of Perak and grandniece of the first Prime Minister of Malaysia, Tunku Abdul Rahman
 Tuanku Bahiyah  – fifth Sultanah (Queen) of Malaysia
 Iman Afzan – Daughter of the 16th King of Malaysia

Government 
 Akierra Missick – Deputy Premier of the Turks and Caicos Islands
 Sir John Sawers – former Permanent Representative of the United Kingdom to the United Nations who later went on before retiring to become Chief of the Secret Intelligence Service (MI6)
 Sir Richard Tilt – Social Fund Commissioner, former Director General HM Prison Service
 Sir Mike Tomlinson – Chief Inspector of Schools
 Datuk Seri Najib Tun Razak – former prime minister of Malaysia (2009–2018)

Military 
 Air Vice Marshal Johnnie Johnson – pilot, Second World War flying ace

Natural sciences, engineering and medicine

Engineering 
 Reginald Coates - civil engineer and former President of the Institution of Civil Engineers
 Frank Halford – aircraft engine designer
 Peter Hansford – civil engineer and (from November 2012) UK government's chief construction adviser
 Onyeche Tifase - electrical engineer and MD/CEO of Siemens Nigeria

Natural sciences 
 Michael Creeth -  Biochemist who confirmed the existence of hydrogen bonds between the purine and pyrimidine bases of DNA 
 David Dolphin - Chemist and lead creator of Visudyne 
 Anil Kakodkar - Nuclear scientist and mechanical engineer 
 Ian Wilmut – embryologist who managed the team who cloned Dolly the sheep

Medicine 
 Monica Lakhanpaul - medical doctor, public health expert, and academic

Religion 
 David Hope, Baron Hope of Thornes – former Lord Archbishop of York 
 Alan Jones - former  Dean of the Episcopal Grace Cathedral in San Francisco
 Henry Luke Orombi - former Archbishop of the church of Uganda

Other
 Kweku Adoboli - former UBS employee known for his role in the 2011 UBS rogue trader scandal
 Richard Best, Baron Best – Director, Joseph Rowntree Foundation
 Sue Biggs CBE - Director General of the Royal Horticultural Society
 Mary Marsh – Director of the NSPCC
 John Monks – former General Secretary of the Trades Union Congress
 Adam Powell – game designer and co-founder of Neopets
 Donna Powell – game designer and co-founder of Neopets
 Dame Helen Reeves – Chief Executive of Victim Support
Kemebradikumo Pondei – acting managing director of Niger Delta Development Commission
 David Sharp - mountaineer
 Sir Nigel Sweeney – High Court Judge
 Greville Wynne – British spy, imprisoned by the KGB
 Levison Wood - Explorer

Sport

 Tim Baillie – London 2012 Canoe Slalom (C2) Olympic gold medallist
 Chris Bartley – London 2012 Men's Four Rowing Olympic silver medallist
 Tim Brabants – three-time Olympic medallist in canoeing
 Kristan Bromley – Skeleton World Cup winner 2003/2004
 Eva Carneiro – British Physician, Chelsea FC Team Doctor  (2009-2015)
 Melissa-Jane Daniel – 5 world records in archery
 David Florence – Beijing 2008 Canoe Slalom(C1) and London 2012 Canoe Slalom (C2) Olympic Silver medallist
 Sir Denis Follows – General Secretary, The Football Association; Chairman, British Olympic Association
 David Mercer – sports broadcaster 
 Brian Moore – England rugby union representative footballer and commentator
 Deryck Murray – former Trinidad and Tobago and West Indies wicket-keeper
 William Henry Revis – scored the first goal for the Nottingham Reds, the UK's oldest football league team. 
 Lynn Simpson – former World Individual and World Series Canoe Slalom Champion 
 Matt Smith – Leicester Tigers rugby player
 Etienne Stott – London 2012 Canoe Slalom (C2) Olympic gold medallist
 Campbell Walsh – Athens 2004 Canoe Slalom (K1) Olympic silver medallist; Canoe Slalom World Cup Champion 2004
 Keith Wyness – former Chief Executive, Everton FC
 Deng Yaping – four times Olympic table tennis champion, voted Chinese female athlete of the century
 Michael Gill – professional cyclist riding for UCI Continental team Saint Piran

Writers and literature
 Meena Alexander – writer and poet
 Christopher Bigsby – novelist and literary critic
 Peter Boardman – mountaineer and writer
 Michael Bracewell – novelist
 Idris Davies – poet
 Nirpal Singh Dhaliwal – novelist
 Jonathan Emmett – children's author
 John Harvey – crime writer
 Michael Hirst – screenwriter, Elizabeth
 Alan Jones – author and Dean of Grace Cathedral, San Francisco

 Bert Keizer – author of Dancing with Mister D: Notes on Life and Death
 D.H. Lawrence – novelist
 Stanley Middleton – novelist, winner of the Booker Prize
 Blake Morrison – novelist, poet, critic and journalist
 Michael Scammell – biographer, translator, Professor of Writing at Columbia University
 Rajesh Talwar - Indian writer

Notable academics

 Gwen Alston - aerodynamicist and educationalist
 Viacheslav Belavkin – mathematician, pioneer of quantum probability
 Wilfrid Butt – biochemist and endocrinologist
 Kenneth Cameron - toponymist of English place-names
 George Carey – Archbishop of Canterbury
 George Checkley – modernist architect
 Bryan Campbell Clarke – pioneering geneticist, particularly noted for his work on apostatic selection, and work with snails
 Stephen Daniels – cultural geographer
 Robert Edgeworth-Johnstone - first Lady Trent professor of chemical engineering
 Esther Eidinow – ancient historian
 Ivan Fesenko – mathematician
 Sir John Ambrose Fleming – pioneer of electronics
 Hugh Gaitskell – Chancellor of the Exchequer, Leader of the Opposition 1955-1963
 Andre Geim – Nobel Prize–winning physicist
 Clive Granger – Nobel Memorial Prize-winning economist
 David Greenaway – economist and Vice Chancellor (2008–)
 Don Grierson – geneticist
 George Garfield Hall – mathematician
 F. B. Hinsley - founder of the School of Mining Engineering 
 Susan Howson – first female winner of the Adams Prize (for mathematics)
 Robin Lyth Hudson – mathematician, pioneer of quantum probability
 Luce Irigaray
 Sir Ian Kershaw – historian, one of the world's leading experts on Adolf Hitler and the Third Reich
 Graham Kendall - Professor of Computer Science and the Provost and CEO of University of Nottingham Malaysia Campus
 Sir Michael Lyons – Chairman, BBC Trust
 Sir Peter Mansfield – physicist who was awarded the 2003 Nobel Prize in Physiology or Medicine
 David H.H. Metcalfe – President, Royal College of General Practitioners
 Tom Paulin – poet and literary critic
 Monica Partridge - first woman Prof at Nottingham University.
 Ivy Pinchbeck - economic historian
 Lewis Thorpe – translator of Medieval works; Professor of French
 Sir Martyn Poliakoff – chemist
 Prof. John Rich - emeritus professor in the department of Classics
 Sir John Cyril Smith – lawyer
 Vivian de Sola Pinto – poet and literary critic
 W. J. H. Sprott – Professor of Philosophy
 John Webster – mycologist
 Vernon White – formerly special lecturer in theology, now principal of STETS and Canon of Winchester
 Richard G. Wilkinson – public health
 Robert Wood - special professor 1998-2005, psychologist and writer
 Xu Zhihong – President, Peking University

References

Nottingham

University